A Country Star Is Born is the debut studio album by American country music artist, Jessi Colter. The album was released April 1970 off of RCA Victor, and was produced by Chet Atkins and Waylon Jennings.

Background 
A Country Star is Born was released after Colter had been signed to RCA Victor, with the help of her husband and country artist, Waylon Jennings. Jennings co-produced the album, along with Chet Atkins. It was her only album for the label, after she would be signed with Capitol Nashville in the mid-1970s. The album spawned one single: "I Ain't the One," a duet with Jennings, however the single failed to chart the Billboard Country Chart upon its release to radio. The album consisted of eleven tracks, including cover versions of Patsy Cline's "He Called Me Baby,"  and Mickey Newbury's "Why You Been Gone So Long." It also included compositions written by Colter, which included the lead single. The album did not chart the Top Country Albums chart. The release was reviewed by Allmusic, and was given three out of five stars.

Track listing 
Source: ArtistDirect, Allmusic

"Too Many Rivers" (Harlan Howard) 2:30
"Cry Softly" (Mirriam Eddy) 2:56 [45rpm single: 47-9826b]
"I Ain't the One" (Mirriam Eddy) 2:13 - with Waylon Jennings [45rpm single: 74-0280b; 47-9920b]
"It's Not Easy" (Frankie Miller) 3:08
"He Called Me Baby" (Harlan Howard) 2:31
"Why You Been Gone So Long" (Mickey Newbury) 3:05
"If She's Where You Like Livin' (You Won't Feel at Home with Me)" (Mirriam Eddy) 2:46 [45rpm single: 47-9826a]
"Healing Hands of Time" (Willie Nelson) 2:34
"That's the Chance I'll Have to Take" (Jackson King) 2:00
"Don't Let Him Go" (Mirriam Eddy) 2:21
"It's All Over Now" (Mirriam Eddy) 2:26

Personnel 
 Jessi Colter – keyboards, vocals

Chart positions 
Album – Billboard (North America),

Singles – Billboard (United States)

References 

1970 debut albums
Jessi Colter albums
Albums produced by Chet Atkins
RCA Victor albums
Albums produced by Waylon Jennings